Flying Swords of Dragon Gate is a 2011 wuxia film directed by Tsui Hark and starring Jet Li, Zhou Xun, Chen Kun, Li Yuchun, Gwei Lun-mei, Louis Fan and Mavis Fan. The film is a remake of Dragon Gate Inn (1966) and New Dragon Gate Inn (1992) but takes place three years after. Production started on 10 October 2010 and is filmed in 3-D. The film screened out of competition at the 62nd Berlin International Film Festival in February 2012. The film was nominated for eight awards at the 2012 Asian Film Awards and won two: Best Visual Effects and Best Costume Design.

Plot 
The Emperor's eunuchs have gained power and influence; the East Bureau and West Bureau spy and police the nation. They visit the shipyards, but only as a cover to execute those who would try and report their taking of bribes to the Emperor. Wandering hero Zhao Huai'an fights the leader of the East Bureau, defeating him and putting his head in a box and hanging it as a warning to other corrupt officials.

The Emperor's chief concubine asks the West Bureau why they waste time on power struggles when she only wants them to prevent the Emperor impregnating anyone aside from her. Three pregnant courtesans have been executed, a fourth is being hunted down. Officials stop a riverboat and are about to execute a woman, but a masked hero intervenes. Zhao watches from nearby and the masked hero also claims to be Zhao. The imposter helps the courtesan flee to Dragons Gate, Zhao and his followers decide to fight the West Bureau to help delay them and aid in the escape.

As a sandstorm threatens and drives most travelers away, a few groups driven by different agendas are determined to stay in the desert at the famous Dragons Gate Inn. Amidst rumors of an ancient city and with Zhao Huai'an and the leader of the West Bureau approaching, events are about to unfold with the Dragons Gate Inn as the stage for an all-out clash.

Cast
 Jet Li as Zhou Huai'an
 Zhou Xun as Ling Yanqiu
 Chen Kun as Yu Huatian and Wind Blade
 Li Yuchun as Gu Shaotang
 Gwei Lun-mei as Zhang Xiao Wen/Tribal princess
 Louis Fan as Ma Jinliang
 Mavis Fan as Su Huirong
 Wu Di as Zhao Tong
 Zhuang Guoqi
 Li Yuan as Kuo Zheng
 Gordon Liu as Wan Yulou
 Zhang Xinyu as Royal Consort Wan
 Zha Ka (aka Han Feixing) as H'Gantga

Production
Although this film is based on the story of 1992's New Dragon Gate Inn, Tsui denied that this film would be a remake of the old classic but more of a re-imagining. Tsui also worked on the screenplay in addition to directing and producing the film, to ensure the originality of the story. Before Jet Li was signed on for the role of Zhou Huai'an, Tsui offered the role to Donnie Yen but he turned it down due to the fact he has no wish to be in sequels/remakes of previous films he has already worked on. Jet Li was signed with US$12 million contracts to star in this film. Li explained his reason for joining this film stating,

Actress Zhou Xun was also quoted for her reason for joining this film and she explains,

Tsui also invited Chuck Comisky, the visual-effects supervisor for James Cameron's Avatar, as the 3-D director to manage the special effects. Comisky will lead a team of 3D crew from China, Korea, Singapore, Spain, etc.

References

External links
 
 
 Flying Swords Of Dragon Gate at Hong Kong Cinemagic
 
 

2011 3D films
2010s action adventure films
Remakes of Hong Kong films
Films directed by Tsui Hark
Kung fu films
Hong Kong martial arts films
Chinese martial arts films
Chinese action adventure films
Wushu films
Wuxia films
2011 films
IMAX films
Hong Kong 3D films
Chinese 3D films
Films set in 15th-century Ming dynasty
Martial arts fantasy films
Polybona Films films
2011 martial arts films
2010s Mandarin-language films
2010s Hong Kong films